Genkaimurex is a genus of sea snails, marine gastropod mollusks in the family Muricidae, the murex snails or rock snails.

Species
Species within the genus Genkaimurex include:

 Genkaimurex fimbriatulus (A. Adams, 1863)
 Genkaimurex monopterus (Pilsbry, 1904)
 Genkaimurex varicosus (Kuroda, 1953)

References

Ocenebrinae